Schytt Glacier is a broad glacier about 60 miles (100 km) long, flowing northward between Giaever and Ahlmann Ridge in Queen Maud Land to the Jelbart Ice Shelf. Mapped by Norwegian cartographers from surveys and air photos by the Norwegian-British-Swedish Antarctic Expedition (NBSAE) (1949–1952) and named for Valter Schytt, second in command and glaciologist of NBSAE.

See also
 List of glaciers in the Antarctic
 Glaciology
List of Nunataks
Valter Butte

References

Glaciers of Queen Maud Land
Princess Martha Coast